Grete Waitz (1 October 195319 April 2011) was a Norwegian marathon runner and former world record holder. In 1979, at the New York City Marathon, she became the first woman in history to run the marathon in under two and a half hours. Waitz won nine New York City Marathons, women's division, between 1978 and 1988, the highest number of victories in a single big city marathon in history. She won the silver medal at the 1984 Olympic Games in Los Angeles and a gold medal at the 1983 World Championships in Helsinki. She was also a five-time winner of the World Cross Country Championships.

Waitz four times set a world record in the marathon, twice at the 3000 metres, and she set world records at distances of 8 kilometers, 10 kilometers, 15 kilometers and 10 miles. She won 12 World Marathon Majors, the most for any runner, earning her a place in the Guinness World Records. Her other marathon victories included winning the London Marathon in 1983 and 1986 and the Stockholm Marathon in 1988.

Background
Born Grete Andersen in Oslo, Norway, Waitz was a talented young runner, but had difficulty in getting her parents to take her potential profession seriously. However, she ran at the 1972 Summer Olympics in Munich in the 1500 metres, and to support her athletic career she studied at a teachers college.

Career
In her teen years, Waitz won national junior titles in Norway in the 400 and 800 metres. At age 17, she set the European junior record for the 1500 metres with a time of 4:17 and won the bronze medal at the European Athletics Championships in this event in 1974. In 1975, Waitz broke the 3000 metres world record, running 8:46.6 in Oslo. Also in Oslo a year later, she lowered this record with an 8:45.4 effort, then in 1977 she won the gold medal over the distance at the inaugural IAAF World Cup in Athletics meet in Düsseldorf with a personal best time of 8:43.50. Two years later in Montreal, she won the silver medal, and came to her all-time personal best of 8:31.75 in Oslo.

She ran the 1500 m at the European Championships in Prague on 3 September 1978. The run was won by Giana Romanova (USSR) in 3:59.01. Waitz placed fifth, with a career best of 4:00.55. It still stands as the Norwegian national record. Back then it was the eighth best time for the 1500 m. On 29 August at the Championships, she placed third in the 3000 m, with a time of 8:34.33. The winner was Svetlana Ulmasova with 8:33.16.

New York City Marathon 1978
It was in 1978 that her association with the New York City Marathon began; she was invited to run there by race co-founder and director Fred Lebow, and in her first appearance she not only won but took a full two minutes off the women's course record. On 22 October 1978, she finished in 2:32:30 more than 9 minutes ahead of Marty Cooksey's 2:41:49. Cooksey won the San Diego Half Marathon on 26 Aug in 1:15:04. Waitz' winning time there was a world record. During 1978 the world record in the women's marathon was 2:34:47.5 set on 10 Sep 1977 by Christa Vahlensieck at the Berlin Marathon. In 1981, the 1978 NYC course was remeasured and found 151 meters short. She further improved her NYC record with her following victories in 1979 and 1980.

According to the Association of Road Racing Statisticans (ARRS) Waitz had a 28 races winning streak from 22 September 1979 with a win in a 10-mile road race in Lynchburg (USA) until 8 June 1981 her win in a 3000 m track race in Basel (Switzerland).

Waitz went on to win the race nine times and broke the course record three years in a row. In 1979, she won the NYC marathon in 2:27:33. Gillian Adams was the runner up with 2:38:33. Her winning time in the 1980 edition was 2:25:41, Patti Lyons-Catalano placed second with 2:29:33.

In 1983, she set the world record to 2:25:29, which she ran in London. Besides her marathon victories in New York and at the 1983 World Championships in Helsinki, Waitz also won the London Marathon in 1983 and 1986 (the latter in a personal best of 2:24:54), as well as the Stockholm Marathon in 1988 at 2:28:24 (which as of 2022 was still the Stockholm course record for women).

Waitz enjoyed much success on the road at non-marathon distances as well, including a win at the Falmouth Road Race in 1980, four victories at the prestigious 10-km Peachtree Road Race in Atlanta, five wins at the L'eggs Mini-Marathon in New York, and world road records at 8 km (25:03), twice in the 10-km (31:16 in 1979, then later to 30:59), 15-km (48:01), and 10-mile distances. She further demonstrated her versatility by successfully competing in cross country, earning two bronze medals (1982, 1984) at the IAAF World Cross Country Championships and winning the gold medal five times, (1978–1981 and 1983), tying her with Doris Brown Heritage for most wins in the history of women's International / World Cross Country Championships.

Her last race was a victory at 5000 metres in Oslo in June 1982, in which her 15:08.80 was the second best in history, falling only a half second short of the world record set three weeks earlier by Mary Slaney.

The only significant award she did not win in her career was an Olympic victory. As an up-and-coming 19-year-old in Munich and then a 23-year-old running the 1500 m in Montreal (the longest event allowed for women in the Olympics up until 1984), she competed, but did not medal, in an event that was far short of her specialty. In 1980, Norway was one of the countries that decided to boycott the 1980 Summer Olympics in Moscow. At the 1984 Summer Olympics, she was beaten in the marathon by Joan Benoit, placing second to take the silver medal. In the 1988 Summer Olympics in Seoul, Korea, a bad knee forced her to drop out of the women's marathon just after passing the 18-mile mark.

Waitz completed her last marathon on 1 November 1992 with her friend Fred Lebow. In celebration of Lebow's 60th birthday, after he was diagnosed with brain cancer in early 1990, they both completed the New York City Marathon with a time of 5:32:35.

Personal bests
Source: IAAF
 1500 metres – 4:00.55 – Prague – 3 September 1978
 One mile – 4:26.90 – Gateshead – 9 July 1978
 3000 metres – 8:31.75 – Oslo (Bislett) – 17 July 1979
 15 kilometres – 47:52 – Tampa, FL – 11 February 1984
 Marathon – 2:24:54 – London – 20 April 1986

After retirement
Although not competing at the top level, Waitz still ran in and organised corporate races in which she aimed to give advice and information on distance running and health. She also did charity work, particularly for the CARE International and the International Special Olympics. In June 2005 it was publicly known that she was undergoing treatment for cancer. She also coached Liz McColgan. For more than 25 years, Waitz served as the ambassador for the worldwide JPMorgan Chase Corporate Challenge Series, promoting health and wellness to full-time workers. She provided regular training and motivational tips. Waitz was also a spokesperson for Avon Products.

In August 2009 it was revealed that Waitz had initiated a co-operation between her old sponsor, Adidas, and the cancer care foundation she started in 2007 – "Aktiv mot kreft" (Norwegian for "Active against cancer"). The co-operation would mean that the cancer care foundation would get 5% of the proceeds from Adidas' sale of their Grete Waitz and Modern Classics collections. This could be as much as NOK 500 million per year, which would go to the establishment of hospital physical training centres and investment in PET-scanners.

Death
Waitz died of cancer on 19 April 2011, aged 57. She was first diagnosed in 2005, but the specific type of cancer was never disclosed to the public. Waitz was survived by her husband Jack and brothers Jan and Arild. The Norwegian government later announced she would be buried with government honor at state expense, the sixth woman in Norwegian history to be given this honor. This was equivalent to a state funeral, although in accordance with her family wishes the ceremony was private.

Legacy
She won 13 out of 20 marathons. With nine NYC Marathon wins, two London Marathon wins, and one World Championship win, she is the record holder for World Major Marathons.

Waitz is widely acknowledged as helping to promote marathon and long-distance running for women. In Norway she is a sporting legend, with an annual race named after her in her honor. The New York Road Runners club annually sponsors "Grete's Great Gallop," formerly a half-marathon and now a 10K, in her honor.

There is a statue of her in the Norway pavilion in EPCOT at the Walt Disney World Resort. There is also a statue of her outside Bislett Stadium in Oslo, and she has been featured on a set of stamps. In addition, her portrait is featured on the tail of a Norwegian Air Shuttle 787 Dreamliner aircraft (a plane, coincidentally, manufactured in North Charleston, South Carolina, a market where she won the Charleston-area 10km race in 1989).

In November 2008, Waitz was appointed a Knight 1st Class of the Royal Norwegian Order of St. Olav, bestowed by King Harald V of Norway at a ceremony in Oslo. She was only the third sportsperson ever to receive this award. Waitz received the St. Olav's Medal in 1981 and Medal of St. Hallvard in 1989.

Achievements

References

Audio interview
TheFinalSprint.com's interview with running pioneer Grete Waitz

External links
Grete Waitz reflects on her, & Fred Lebow's, last NYC Marathon – 2008 NY Daily News article by Wayne Coffey (archived copy)
Google Doodle tribute to Grete Waitz

1953 births
2011 deaths
Athletes from Oslo
Norwegian female long-distance runners
Norwegian female marathon runners
Norwegian female middle-distance runners
Olympic athletes of Norway
Olympic silver medalists for Norway
Athletes (track and field) at the 1972 Summer Olympics
Athletes (track and field) at the 1976 Summer Olympics
Athletes (track and field) at the 1984 Summer Olympics
Athletes (track and field) at the 1988 Summer Olympics
European Athletics Championships medalists
World Athletics Championships athletes for Norway
World Athletics Championships medalists
World Athletics Cross Country Championships winners
London Marathon female winners
New York City Marathon female winners
World record setters in athletics (track and field)
Deaths from cancer in Norway
Recipients of the St. Olav's Medal
Medalists at the 1984 Summer Olympics
Olympic silver medalists in athletics (track and field)
World Athletics Championships winners